Black Earth Rising is a 2018 British television miniseries written and directed by Hugo Blick, about the prosecution of international war criminals. The series is a co-production between BBC Two and Netflix. The show aired on BBC Two in the United Kingdom starting on the 10 September 2018;  Netflix began streaming the show internationally outside the UK on 25 January 2019.

Plot
The story centres on Kate Ashby, who works as a legal investigator in the London law chambers of Michael Ennis. When Kate's adoptive mother Eve takes on a case prosecuting an Rwandan militia leader, the story pulls Michael and Kate into a journey that will upend their lives forever.

Cast
 Michaela Coel as Kate Ashby, a 28-year-old, Rwandan-born British legal investigator
 John Goodman as Michael Ennis, an American divorced barrister living and working in the UK; employer of Kate Ashby
 Tamara Tunie as Eunice Clayton, US Assistant Secretary of State for African Affairs
 Noma Dumezweni as Alice Munezero, a Rwandan government official and former general in the Rwandan Patriotic Army
 Harriet Walter as Eve Ashby, Kate's adoptive mother, and an international prosecution barrister
 Danny Sapani as General Simon Nyamoya, a former Tutsi corporal who helped bring the Rwandan Genocide to an end
 Tyrone Huggins as Patrice Ganimana, a Rwandan Hutu who helped implement the Rwandan Genocide
 Ronald Guttman as Jacques Antoine Barré, a former advisor to the Élysée Palace between 1987 and 1994
 Aure Atika as Sophie Barré, daughter of Jacques Antoine Barré; CEO of Barré Resources
 Abena Ayivor as Bibi Mundanzi; the overwhelmingly well-liked, third-term president of Rwanda, and adoptive sister of Alice Munezero
 Lucian Msamati as David Runihura, special advisor to the Rwandan president
 Mimi Ndiweni as Mary Mundanzi, daughter of Bibi Mundanzi and David Runihura
 Hugo Blick as Blake Gaines, a successful, unscrupulous defence barrister and rival of Ennis; hired to defend Patrice Ganimana
 Kathryn Hunter as Capi Petridis, prosecutor of the International Criminal Court
 Serge Hazanavicius as Marc Previeau, a senior French  based in Paris
 Emmanuel Imani as Florence Karamera, a mysterious man aiding and protecting Kate
 Julian Glover as Mark Viner, a retired barrister and Eve Ashby's former boss
 Malou Coindreau as Hana Ennis, Michael's daughter and a former financial analyst, who has been in a coma for three years
 Michael Gould as Harper Hopkinson, a book illustrator and Hana Ennis's stepfather

Episodes

Series 1 (2018)

Production
The series was commissioned as Black Earth Rising in 2017. For some time during production it was known as The Forgiving Earth, but it went back to its original title by April 2018.

During a night shoot of a car stunt scene in Ghana, camera operator Mark Milsome was killed.

The production used a private residence in Sevenoaks, Kent for some of the filming; the swimming pool of the residence doubled for a spa hotel in Paris.

Bill Murray, Dan Aykroyd, Steve Martin, George Wendt, Chevy Chase, Jim Belushi and Jason Alexander were all considered for the role of Michael Ennis before John Goodman was cast.

Reception 
Critics were overwhelmingly positive. The miniseries has a score of 79% positive reviews on review aggregator Rotten Tomatoes, with the consensus: "Black Earth Rising is an exceptional political thriller, confronting relevant challenges and deep-seated geopolitical problems with storytelling verve and a wise refusal to provide any easy answers."

References

External links

Black Earth Rising at Netflix

2018 British television series debuts
2018 British television series endings
2010s British drama television series
2010s British television miniseries
BBC television dramas
Works about the Rwandan genocide
Works about the International Criminal Court
English-language Netflix original programming
Television series by BBC Studios
Television shows set in Africa
Television shows set in London
Television shows set in the Netherlands
Television shows filmed in Ghana